Loewiini is a tribe of bristle flies in the family Tachinidae. There are about six genera and eight described species in Loewiini.

Genera
These six genera belong to the tribe Loewiini:
 Chiricahuia Townsend, 1918
 Coloradomyia Arnaud, 1963
 Eloceria Robineau-Desvoidy, 1863
 Hyalurgus Brauer and Bergenstamm, 1893
 Loewia Egger, 1856
 Triarthria Stephens, 1829

References

Further reading

External links

 
 

Tachininae
Brachycera tribes